Gennady Myasnikov (12 September 1919 – 1989) was a Soviet production designer. He was nominated for an Academy Award for Best Art Direction for his work on the epic film War and Peace (1967). He was born in Sosnovka (now Perm Krai).

References

External links

Kino-Teatr.ru 

1919 births
1989 deaths
Soviet production designers
Date of death missing
Place of death missing